Khalid Hamdaoui is a Dutch footballer (with ancestral roots tracing back to Morocco) who played in 2013 for Woodlands Wellington in the S.League. He signed in the beginning of 2014 with Al-Nasr SC (Salalah), from Oman.

Khalid is comfortable in playing any position across the midfield and is a former Dutch Under-21 international.

Club career

Youth career in the Netherlands
Born and raised in Amsterdam, Khalid was discovered as a youth prodigy while playing for non-league side, SC Overamstel. He was then drafted into the prestigious Ajax Amsterdam youth academy where he played alongside Roy Makaay and Rafael van der Vaart.

Upon leaving the academy, Khalid subsequently spent 2 seasons each for Eredivisie sides AZ Alkmaar and NAC Breda.

Tokyo Verdy 1969
In 2001, Hamdaoui made an important step to further his footballing career, travelling to Japan as an 18-year-old for trials.

The president of J.League side Tokyo Verdy 1969 was impressed by his Ajax Amsterdam background and he was offered him a contract.

Among Hamdaoui's colleagues in the Japanese team was the well-known Brazilian star Edmundo, who signed for Tokyo Verdy 1969 during the 2001 J. League Division 1 mid-season transfer window.

Dundee FC
After spending a year in the Portuguese Primeira Liga with O Elvas C.A.D. and another three seasons back home in the Netherlands with MVV Maastricht and FC Omniworld, Hamdaoui made the switch to Scottish First Division side, Dundee FC during the 2006–07 Scottish First Division season.

He made an impressive start for Dundee FC when he scored twice and created an assist for a teammate in a friendly match.

Hamdaoui's first goal in the Scottish First Division would come against Clyde FC on 17 February 2007.

Raja Casablanca
In 2008, Hamdaoui decided to trace his ancestral roots and move to Morocco.

He subsequently signed a contract with Raja Casablanca on 5 August 2008, one of the most celebrated football clubs of North Africa, and won a Botola championship medal with the Green Eagles during the 2008–09 season.

Woodlands Wellington
On 14 January 2013, S.League club, Woodlands Wellington, announced that it had captured the signing of Hamdaoui after the Dutchman had impressed the management during his trial with the club.

On 21 February 2013, Hamdaoui made his debut for the Rams in a home game against Warriors F.C. where he outshone Kazuyuki Toda by scoring one goal and assisting Moon Soon-Ho to another, helping the Rams draw the match with a 2 – 2 scoreline.

Khalid's six-month contract ended with the Rams in June 2013 and his contract was not extended. He played 12 league matches for Woodlands Wellington and scored 4 goals.

Al-Nasr SC
On 5 January 2014, Khalid Hamdaoui signed a 1-year contract with Al-Nasr SC (Salalah), from Qatar. "Khalid is the perfect player for the plans of Al-Nasr. They were looking for that kind of player", said Robert Cristian Trif, Hamdaoui's agent.

Club career statistics

All numbers encased in brackets signify substitute appearances.

Achievements

Moroccan League: 2009

Quotes about Hamdaoui
"He has terrific ability and craft" – Alex Rae, former Dundee FC coach.

References

External links
 Khalid about Issy and Dundee
 Soccerbase stats
 Khalid Hamdaoui Interview

1981 births
Living people
Moroccan footballers
Dundee F.C. players
Scottish Football League players
Expatriate footballers in Scotland
Association football midfielders